Alan Burton Goldstone (April 9, 1928 – October 22, 2019) was an American composer, conductor, consultant, producer, production manager and screenwriter.

Early life 
Burton was born in Columbus, Ohio. He graduated from Northwestern University, when he earned his degree, in 1948.

Career 
Burton started his career in 1949, as producing and writing the variety Campus to Campus.

In 1950s-1970s, Burton produced television programs and films, including, The Oscar Levant Show, Hollywood a Go-Go and Malibu U, among others.

In 1970s-1980s, Burton started working with screenwriter, Norman Lear on his soap opera television series, Mary Hartman, Mary Hartman. He also was a composer, conductor and consultant for Diff'rent Strokes (and its spin-off The Facts of Life) and Hello, Larry.

In 1980s-2019, Burton worked on Charles in Charge, as the executive producer. Later in his career, he worked on Family Guy, The Tonight Show Starring Jimmy Fallon, The Goldbergs, Saturday Night Live and Brooklyn Nine-Nine.

Death 
Burton died on October 22, 2019, of natural causes at his home in San Mateo, California, at the age of 91.

References

External links 

1928 births
2019 deaths
Television producers from Ohio
American television writers
American film producers
American television composers
American composers
American conductors (music)
American consultants
People from Columbus, Ohio
20th-century American composers
20th-century American conductors (music)
Northwestern University alumni